Satyanand Bhogta is an Indian Politician and a member of the Rashtriya Janata Dal political party. He is the current cabinet minister for ministry of Labour Resources in Government of Jharkhand and a member of Jharkhand Legislative Assembly from Chatra constituency.

Career
He was twice the member of state legislative assembly from Chatra from 2000 to 2009. He was state Drinking water,  Sanitation and agriculture minister.

In 2014, he joined Jharkhand Vikas Morcha (Prajatantrik) after BJP denied ticket to him from Chatra. In Jharkhand Legislative Assembly election 2019, Satyanand Bhogta was elected as M.L.A. of Chatra as RJD candidate.

Views
In 2022, he showed his displeasure over the inclusion of Bhogta caste which was earlier in Scheduled Caste to Scheduled Tribe. As he belongs to Bhogta community and he as well as people from Bhogta community will not be able to contest Chatra Assembly constituency which is reserved for Scheduled Caste. According to him, it is a conspiracy against Bhogta as after inclusion in Scheduled Tribe, Bhogta people will not be able to contest Schedule Caste reserved seat and Bhogta people will not be able to win in Schedule Tribe seat as they are minority in Scheduled Tribe reserved seat area.

References 

Living people
Bharatiya Janata Party politicians from Jharkhand
Jharkhand MLAs 2000–2005
Jharkhand MLAs 2005–2009
Year of birth missing (living people)
People from Chatra district
Jharkhand politicians by Rashtriya Janata Dal
Nagpuria people